Mazekan (also Romanized as Mazekān; also known as Mazeh Kān) is a village in Pol Beh Bala Rural District, Simakan District, Jahrom County, Fars Province, Iran. At the 2006 census, its population was 934, in 206 families.

References 

Populated places in Jahrom County